Shes's So Beautiful may refer to:

"She's So Beautiful", a song by Cliff Richard from the Dave Clark 1986 concept album Time
"She's So Beautiful", a song by the band Aslan
She’s so beautiful, (היא כל כך יפה), song by Israeli rock band Kaveret